Uttarlai Air Force Station  of the Indian Air Force (IAF) is located in Uttarlai in Barmer, Rajasthan, India.

History
Notable advantages of this Air Force Station during India 1971 war was that this airfield had been developed into a forward airfield and could remain best suitable for all sorts of strike purposes. It facilitated easy operation of HF-24 Maruts, Gnats, Hunters and MiGs.

Facilities

Civil Flights Planning
The Government of Rajasthan is working to make this civil enclave operational soon to benefit the people of Barmer and outsiders working in petro refinery project of HPCL. Till the airport becomes functional, flights will operate from Air force field.

References

Indian Air Force bases